{{Speciesbox
| taxon = Bradyrhizobium yuanmingense| authority = Yao et al. 2002
}}Bradyrhizobium yuanmingense is a species of legume-root nodulating, endosymbiont nitrogen-fixing bacterium, associated with Lespedeza and Vigna'' species. Its type strain is CCBAU 10071(T) (= CFNEB 101(T)).

References

Further reading

External links

LPSN
Type strain of Bradyrhizobium yuanmingense at BacDive -  the Bacterial Diversity Metadatabase

Nitrobacteraceae
Bacteria described in 2002